The following is a list of episodes for Life, an American police drama television program created by Rand Ravich that aired for two seasons on NBC. It was produced by Universal Media Studios under the supervision of executive producers Rand Ravich, Far Shariat, David Semel, and Daniel Sackheim. Semel also directed the pilot.

The series stars Damian Lewis as Charlie Crews, a detective released from prison after serving twelve years for a crime he did not commit.  Life premiered on September 26, 2007, on NBC and aired on Wednesday nights at 10 EST.  On May 4, 2009, NBC announced Life would not be returning for a third season.

Series overview

Episodes

Season 1 (2007)

Season 2 (2008–09)

References

External links 
 

Lists of American crime drama television series episodes